Punjabi Radio USA (1450 AM) is a Multicultural radio station. Licensed to Yuba City, California, United States. KOBO 1450 AM is simulcast with KIID 1470 AM, KLHC 1350 AM, KCVR 1570 AM and KWRU 1300 AM.

The station was sold by Tom Huth (Huth Broadcasting) to Punjabi American Media LLC, which provide programs under the banner of Punjabi Radio USA.The sale was consummated on October 13, 2015.

The Punjabi American community in Sutter County is one of the largest outside the state of Punjab, India. It is most concentrated in South Yuba City where 20.2% of residents are South Asian, predominantly Punjabi, followed by Live Oak (7.8%), Tierra Buena (7.8%), and Yuba City (6.4%).Punjabi Americans are among California's most successful farmers. Immigrants from India's Punjab region have adopted new methods while preserving—and sharing—the customs and culture of their ancestral homeland.

In 2013 Kash Gill and 2017 Preet Didbal were named the first Sikh/Punjabi American Mayors of Yuba City.

Format history
2015- Punjabi Radio USA
2014-2015 Radio SEPA (Spanish Catholic)
2011-2014 Radio Tepeyac (Spanish Catholic)
2009-2011 Oasis Radio (Spanish Christian)
1993-2008 Radio La Gran D
1991-1993 Simulcast of KEST
1982-1989 News/TalkThe Rush Limbaugh ShowNBC TalknetLarry King ShowJim Bohannon
1969-1982 Top 40
1966-1969 KZIN
1954-1966 KAGR 100 watts
1941-1952 KMYC

Sports
2005-2012 River Valley High School Football
1986-1989 Oakland Athletics Baseball
1986-1989 San Francisco 49ers Football
1986-1989 California Golden Bears Football

External links
Punjabi Radio USA
Punjabi Radio USA Facebook Page

OBO